1937 is a remix album released in 2005 on Sounds Are Active by the avant-garde group Soul-Junk.

Track listing
"Opidish" – 0:31
(Slo-Ro Vs. M.C. Ponderosa remix)
"Begollar Tempus" – 3:58
(Aelters remix)
p&c e.alters at home, Oct – Nov 2003
"Seahorse Posing As Colorform" – 3:45
(Create (!) Vs. Accident remix)
Orlando Greenhill – Electric bass
Andrew Pompey – acoustic drums
Chris Schlarb – acoustic piano
Produced by Accident
"Poolfullofstatic" – 3:04
(Hairspray Or No? remix)
"Aiming Narrow" – 2:49
(Wobbly remix)
"Jammy July Pike Remix" – 2:56
([Drekka] remix)
Drekka appears courtesy of Bluesanct
"Hornfront" – 3:06
(Poison Arrows remix)
"Soul Structures Sourced" – 4:46
(Stephen Ruiz remix)
"Atari Atari" – 5:11
(Professor Kermit / Anish Vyas remix)
Anish Vyas on Bass
"Jibjob" – 3:15
(Matt Davignon remix)
"NOVA" – 3:45
(Soul-Junk/Evig Poesi remix)
"Ungst Func Slang Collision" – 3:35
(Dev79 remix)
Remixed at seclusiasis studio
"Totale" – 4:13
(Looproad "Ruby Doomsday" remix)
"Creech" – 1:59
(Soul-Junk remix)
"Non-Linear" – 4:25
(Jason Talbot remix)
"Organ Air" – 10:29
(Patagonia remix)
"Clarks Green" – 1:37
(Therefore remix)
"Canhop" – 4:10
(Leafcutter John remix)
"Wack M.C." – 6:17
(Soul-Junk remix)

Production credits
Artwork by Paul Goode and Jonathan Dueck
Curated by Slo-Ro
Mastered by Rafter Roberts

References

Soul-Junk remix albums
2005 remix albums
Sounds Are Active remix albums